Glo or GLO may refer to:

Science
 3267 Glo, an asteroid
 Gulonolactone oxidase

Transport
 GLO Airlines, a defunct American airline
 Glossop railway station, England
 Gloucestershire Airport, England
 Gol Transportes Aéreos

Other uses 
 Glo (album), by the band Delirious?
 Glo (band), a Canadian band
 Glo, Kentucky
 Galambu language
 General Land Office, a former US agency
 Globacom, a Nigerian telecommunications company
 Group litigation order, in England and Wales
 Kobo Glo, an e-reader
 Greek letter organizations, fraternities and sororities on colleges and Universities
 Lhoba people, an ethic group in southeastern Tibet
 glo, a heated tobacco product from British American Tobacco

See also
 Glow (disambiguation)